Kerstin Norborg (born 1961 in Lund) is a Swedish writer and poet. She lives in Stockholm and works as a writing teacher at Öland's Folk High School. Her first poetry collection was Vakenlandet (Waking Land), 1994. She published a novel Min faders hus (House of Father), 2001. She won Swedish radio prize (2002) and Gleerups prize (2002).

References

21st-century Swedish poets
21st-century Swedish novelists
1961 births
Living people
Swedish women poets
20th-century Swedish poets
Date of birth missing (living people)
People from Lund
20th-century Swedish women writers
21st-century Swedish women writers
Swedish women novelists
Swedish schoolteachers